Usri Falls is a waterfall located in Giridih district in the Indian state of Jharkhand. It is a popular tourist and picnic spot. Ushree means a "beautiful source".

Geography

Location
Taxis, tongas and auto-rickshaws are available.

Note: The map alongside presents some of the notable locations in the district. All places marked in the map are linked in the larger full screen map.

Description
The Usri River, a tributary of the Barakar River,  flows down a steep gorge. It is surrounded by dense forest.

The character of the gneissic complex of this region is well exposed. Some of the rocks have been split up into blocks of huge dimension whose polished and clean surfaces have been chequered by veins of various hues. The profile of the river bed changes after passing through the falls. The lower portion is mostly flat, slightly undulating, which gives way to gorge like form.
The government has taken several steps to develop the area as a prominent tourist spot along with Khandoli Dam and Parasnath.

See also
List of waterfalls in India
List of waterfalls in India by height

References

External links

Waterfalls of Jharkhand
Giridih district